The Museum-Residence of Guerra Junqueiro is a former-residence and museum located in the civil parish of Cedofeita, Santo Ildefonso, Sé, Miragaia, São Nicolau e Vitória, in the Portuguese north, municipality of Porto, classified as a Imóvel de Interesse Público (Property of Public Interest).

History

Between 1730 and 1746, the house was built by the order of Domingos Barbosa, magisterial deacon of the Sé Cathedral of Porto. Traditionally, the work was attributed to Nicolau Nasoni, but has been recently revised based on new studies which suggest that António Pereira, who worked in Porto during the same time, was the original architect. In reality, it is difficult to determine which of the architects was attributed to either of the Italian architects; similar problems are behind the Palácio de São João Novo which was original attributed to Nasoni, but after examination was attributed to António Pereira. The similar facades of the residence Dr. Domingos Barbosa and the Palácio de São João Novo made investigators attribute the first to António Pereira.

Following his death, the house became the property of Manuel Barbosa de Albuquerque, his brother, who nominated his descendant and nephew, Fernando Barbosa de Albuquerque as its successor.

On 15 September 1850, Abílio Manuel Guerra Junqueiro was born in Freixo de Espada-à-Cinta.

Between the later 19th and the 20th centuries, the property was passed between various descendants of D. Sancha Augusta de Lemos Barbosa e Albuquerque: she was succeeded by Francisco de Sales Pinto de Mesquita Carvalho, her nephew in 1908, then the descendants of Francisco Sales Pinto de Mesquita (in 1934). It was the last whom D. Maria Isabel Guerra Junqueiro, the widow of Luís Augusto Pinto de Mesquita Carvalho (brother of Francisco de Sales Pinto de Mesquita Carvalho), acquired the home to install the collections of his father (Guerra Junqueiro). In 1940, D. Maria Isabel along with her mother, Filomena Neves donated the home to the municipal hall of Porto, that included the home and collection of her father's works at the museum (approximately 600 works). In 1942, the re-imagined museum was re-opened to the public, that included many of furniture, sculptures, Nuremberg plates and ceramics.

Between 1991 and 1992, the building was expanded, under the authorship of architect Alcino Soutinho. A similar expansion occurred in 1996, but this time archeological excavations were undertake. Between 1994 and 1997, the Museum-Residence was remodeled under the direction of Alcino Soutinho, to install a temporary exposition hall, a small auditorium and shop.

Architecture
The museum-residence occurs in the historic centre, behind the Sé Cathedral of Porto, fronting the Rua de D. Hugo and opening the spaces to the north and south. The house addorsed to the western wall of the Primeira Cerca do Burgo Portuense that extends to the south, delimiting the south facade of the boxed patio-garden, included in the classification of the property. The residence is confined by the Rua de D. Hugo, in the barrio of the Sé cathedral, along the lateral facade marked by three windows, that is similar to the Casa do Despacho da Ordem Terceira de São Francisco. The respective flags, with exotic design, similar to the Chapel of the Quinta de Fafiães, then designed by the Italian architect Manuel Barbosa de Albuquerque, cantor at the Sé Cathedral. This elevation extends through the wall that isolates the courtyard from the public road and is imposed by the monumentality of the portal, crowned by a pair of lions and two fleurs-de-lis, heraldic elements borrowed from the Barbosa de Albuquerque coat of arms.

The rectangular plan home has three distinguishing facets and covered in tiled-roof. The three-floor eastern facade, and includes decorative elements that are incorporated into the south facade (albeit in grander form). This main facade is oriented to the garden and marked by a grande symmetry that includes towers and enhanced corners. These rectangular towers with chamfered corners, occupied by windows over triangular terraces/veranda, creating personal viewpoints. The entrance has a triangular pediment that supports a window and connects to the second-floor veranda. The northern facade is symmetrical, with frame-less granite openings. The southern and eastern walls include framed openings with various, different granite sculptures.

The interior spaces is dominated by a three-floor central staircase, linking to two halls on each floor, and facing the main entrance-way on the ground floor. This main floor is dominated by six wings framed with sculpted granite arches, which contrasts with the other walls which have no decoration. On the second landing of the staircase are three arches that oversee the main window on the third floors. The last landing of the staircase are decorated by monumental consoles. The top towers are linked by corridor.

References

Notes

Sources
 
 
 
 
 
 
 

Houses completed in 1730
Museums in Porto
Historic house museums in Portugal
Poetry museums
Biographical museums in Portugal
1730 establishments in Portugal
Properties of Public Interest in Portugal